Delta College may refer to:

 Delta College (Michigan), near Bay City
 Delta Technical College, Horn Lake, Mississippi
 Louisiana Delta Community College, Monroe, Louisiana
 Mississippi Delta Community College, Moorhead, Mississippi
 San Joaquin Delta College, Stockton, California

See also 
 KIPP: Delta Collegiate High School, in Helena-West Helena, Arkansas
 Delta State (disambiguation)
 Delta (disambiguation)
 Delta University (disambiguation)